Trilok Pratap Rana (1933-2014) was a Nepalese judge who served as 10th Chief Justice of Nepal, in office from 15 February 1997 to 17 September 1997. He was appointed by the then-king of Nepal, Birendra.

Rana was preceded by Surendra Prasad Singh and succeeded by Om Bhakta Shrestha. He was also a former president of SAARC Law Nepal.

References 

Chief justices of Nepal
2014 deaths